Ritual is the second studio album by the British Indie rock band White Lies. It was released on 17 January 2011 by Fiction Records. The album was produced by Alan Moulder and Max Dingel, at the Assault & Battery Studios in London. The art direction and design were done by Tom Hingston Studio, featuring the Hartridge twins, Alice and Jessica, on the cover. The album's lead single, "Bigger than Us", was released on 3 January 2011.

A Ritual short film was released, containing three songs from the album: "Bad Love", "Holy Ghost" and "Bigger than Us".

As of January 2012, UK sales stand at 95,000 copies according to The Guardian.

Track listing

Critical reception 

Ritual was met with mixed reviews from contemporary music critics. On review aggregator website, Metacritic, Ritual has an average score of 60 out of 100, indicating "mixed reviews" from 24 reviews. Album of the Year gave Ritual an aggregate score of 54 out of 100 based on 23 critic reviews, indicating "mixed reviews". 

Jeff Leven, writing for Paste praised Ritual, praising the instrumentation in particular. Leven said of Ritual that "the sonic touches, song structure and performances are often immaculate, adventurous and loaded with intent. There are rarely guitars for the sake of guitars, and the washes of sound conjure ebony skies in a way that obscures the identity of the players themselves in service of the tableau". Leven ultimately gave Ritual an 8.4 out of 10, which was the highest amongst contemporary professional critics. Brian Boyd of The Irish Times also praised Ritual, giving it the "Album of the Week" distinction. Boyd described the album as "prog goth", and gave extra praise the vocals of Harry McVeigh saying that McVeigh's voice is "big and bold, with an industrial undertow." Boyd awarded the album a four out of five-star rating.

In a more mixed review, Chris Mandle of the New Musical Express called Ritual felt the album was particularly derivative, comparing it to outtakes of Pornography by The Cure, or Turn on the Bright Lights by Interpol. Mandle also felt that the songs were much longer than necessary saying that the tracks on Ritual are "a hole where the album’s heart should be. Ritual takes itself incredibly seriously, going so far as to stretch songs out to an average length of five minutes apiece lest their importance be lost. It’s an album that speaks at you rather than to you, and whose only real method of connection is a well-crafted chorus or 10." Mandle did disclaim that there "is nothing gravely wrong" with Ritual and offered praise to the album's production and hooks, saying "the grandiose production style of Alan Moulder is also put to good use, and in addition to the album’s crisp, gleaming sound." Mandle gave Ritual a three out of five-star rating.

Gregory Heaney of Allmusic also offered a mixed review of the album. Heaney did offer praise for Ritual having a more distinct sound, allowing for White Lies to "step out of the shadow of the likes of (contemporary bands) Interpol and Editors".  Heaney did offer compliments to the breaks in the album's tense and ethereal content saying that the band's "ability to break up the gloom with the occasional soaring moment" is impressive. 

Writing for Pitchfork, Ian Cohen panned the album summarising Ritual as "wildly overwrought and painfully dull". Cohen dismissed the album as poorly written, and with cringeworthy lyrics. Describing the sound of the album, he compared the album to bands like Glasvegas saying that "once you've lived through Glasvegas and such, so you should know the drill by now: guitars whoosh and whir to sound exactly like synthesizers while the actual synthesizer goo provides the empty calories required for nearly every track on Ritual to reach its completely arbitrary five-minute length." Describing the instrumentation, Cohen said "The constant hi-hats and thrumming bass are meant to imply some sense of urgent momentum, and the inevitable half-time chorus lets McVeigh over-sing even more. Take all these ingredients, mix them together, and voila-- instant UK buzzband." Cohen ultimately gave Ritual a 2.5 out of 10.

Stacy Anderson of Rolling Stone also was critical of Ritual critiquing the vocals on the album. Anderson said "when McVeigh beats you over the head with his bummed wail on "Bigger Than Us," you'll want to slip him some Wellbutrin." Anderson gave Ritual a two out of five-star rating.

Personnel
White Lies
 Harry McVeigh – lead vocals, guitar
 Charles Cave – bass guitar, backing vocals
 Jack Lawrence-Brown – drums

Additional personnel
 Alan Moulder – production
 Max Dingel – production

Charts

Weekly charts

Year-end charts

References

2011 albums
White Lies (band) albums
Fiction Records albums
Albums produced by Alan Moulder